Anthony Marin (born 21 September 1989) is a French footballer who plays for US Marseille Endoume as a defender.He has previously played for Fréjus Saint-Raphaël, Le Pontet, Ajaccio and Nîmes.

References

1989 births
Living people
Footballers from Marseille
Association football defenders
French footballers
ÉFC Fréjus Saint-Raphaël players
US Pontet Grand Avignon 84 players
Nîmes Olympique players
AC Ajaccio players
US Marseille Endoume players
Championnat National players
Ligue 2 players